The Goa Democratic Front (GDF) or Goa Democratic People Front (GDPF) is a regional political party in the Indian state of Goa. It was established in 2014 a splinter faction of the Indian National Congress. GDF was led by Dayanand Narvekar.

References

Political parties in Goa
2014 establishments in Goa
Political parties established in 2014